2006 Louisiana–Lafayette Ragin' Cajuns football team represented the University of Louisiana at Lafayette in the 2006 NCAA Division I FBS football season. The Ragin' Cajuns were led by fifth-year head coach Rickey Bustle and played their home games at Cajun Field. The Ragin' Cajuns finished the season with a record of 6–6 overall and 3–4 in Sun Belt Conference play.

Preseason

Sun Belt Media Day

Preseason Standings

Preseason All-Conference Team

Offense
QB Jerry Babb
RB Tyrell Fenroy
OL Brandon Cox

Defensive
DL Tony Hills

Preseason Offensive Player of the Year
QB Jerry Babb, Louisiana-Lafayette

Schedule

Source: RaginCajuns.com: 2006 football schedule

Game summaries

@ LSU

@ Texas A&M

Eastern Michigan

@ Houston

@ Florida Atlantic

Middle Tennessee

@ Troy

North Texas

@ Florida International

Arkansas State

Louisiana-Monroe

Postseason

All–Conference Team 

First-Team Offense
OL Greg Hodges
OL Brandon Cox

First-Team Special Teams
AP Michael Desormeaux

Second-Team Offense
RB Tyrell Fenroy
OL Jesse Newman

Second-Team Defense
DE Eugene Kwarteng

Honorable Mentions
DE Anthony Hills
CB Michael Adams

Postseason awards
Steven Jyles, ULM - Player of the Year
Steven Jyles, ULM - Offensive Player of the Year
Jeff Littlejohn, MTSU - Defensive Player of the Year
Aaron Weathers, UNT - Newcomer of the Year
Tyrell Fenroy, ULL - Freshman of the Year
Stephen Roberts, ARST - Coach of the Year

References

Louisiana-Lafayette
Louisiana Ragin' Cajuns football seasons
Louisiana-Lafayette Ragin' Cajuns football